Mullaghreelan Rath is a ringfort (rath) and National Monument located in County Kildare, Ireland.

Location
It is surrounded by Mullaghreelan Woods, a Coillte forest.

History and archaeology
The rath was mentioned in ancient Irish manuscripts in association with the Kings of Leinster: rí Raithleand (King of Reelan) is mentioned twice in Lebor na Cert. In 1854, a celt was found in the rath. In 1861, a Bronze Age burial urn was discovered nearby.

References

Archaeological sites in County Kildare
National Monuments in County Kildare